His Majesty's Lieutenant (German: Der Leutnant Ihrer Majestät) is a 1929 German silent romance film directed by Jacob Fleck and Luise Fleck and starring Iván Petrovich, Agnes Esterhazy and Georg Alexander. It was shot at the Staaken Studios in Berlin.

Cast
 Iván Petrovich as Graf Georg Michailowitsch 
 Agnes Esterhazy as Kaiserin 
 Georg Alexander as Kammerherr Graf Alexandroff 
 Lilian Ellis as 3. Hofdame, Komtesse Olga von Bursanow 
 Ferdinand Hart as Kaiser 
 Mary Kid as 2. Hofdame, Gräfin Xenia Baranowskaja 
 Alexander Murski as Oberhofmeister Graf von Bursanow 
 Lya Christy as 1. Hofdame, Fürstin Louboff Wolgoff

References

Bibliography
Prawer, S.S. Between Two Worlds: The Jewish Presence in German and Austrian Film, 1910–1933. Berghahn Books, 2005.

External links

1929 films
Films of the Weimar Republic
1929 romance films
German silent feature films
German romance films
Films directed by Jacob Fleck
Films directed by Luise Fleck
German black-and-white films
1920s German films
Films shot at Staaken Studios